Berwick Town Hall is a municipal facility in Marygate, Berwick-upon-Tweed, England. The town hall, which was the headquarters of Berwick-upon-Tweed Borough Council, is a Grade I listed building.

History
The current building was commissioned to replace an earlier tolbooth which dated back to the late 13th century. The tolbooth was rebuilt in the late 16th century, and again in 1669. Lancelot Errington, a master mariner noted for his capture of Lindisfarne during the Jacobite rising of 1715, was arrested and held at the tolbooth along with his nephew in October 1715, but they managed to tunnel out of the building, escape and were subsequently pardoned. The tolbooth was demolished in 1750 in order the facilitate the construction of the eastern end of the current building.

The construction of the new building, which was undertaken by local builder, Joseph Dodds, began at the western end in 1754. It was designed by Samuel and John Worrell in the neoclassical style and, after the eastern end had been completed, it opened as Berwick Town Hall in 1760. The design involved a symmetrical main frontage facing west along Marygate; it featured a tetrastyle portico, approached by a flight of steps, with Tuscan order columns supporting a frieze with the inscription "Finished MDCCLIV William Temple Esq, Mayor" and a pediment above containing the borough coat of arms. A  belfry and clock tower with a weather vane, designed in a similar design to St Martin-in-the-Fields, towered above the portico. Internally, the principal room was the assembly hall on the first floor: it featured a Venetian window at the east end. Prison cells were established on the top floor. Pevsner described the monumental portico as "Vanbrughian"

After the Second World War the proposed demolition of the town hall was considered by the borough council, but after a campaign by the architect, Sir Albert Richardson, opposing the proposal, it was extensively refurbished instead. Queen Elizabeth II, accompanied by the Duke of Edinburgh, toured the restored building with Richardson on 10 July 1956.

The town hall served as the meeting place of Berwick-upon-Tweed Borough Council until it was abolished in April 2009 and subsequently became the meeting place of Berwick-upon-Tweed Town Council.

Works of art in the town hall include a portrait of Robert Home, who served as town clerk in the mid 19th century, by the former President of the Royal Scottish Academy, Daniel Macnee.

Bells
The tower above the building has a ring of eight bells and a curfew bell. Lester and Pack of the Whitechapel Bell Foundry cast the tenor, third, fourth and treble bells in 1754 and the fifth and sixth bells in 1759. Charles Carr of Smethwick cast the second and curfew bells in 1894. Mears and Stainbank of the Whitechapel Bell Foundry cast the seventh bell in 1901.

References

Grade I listed buildings in Northumberland
Government buildings completed in 1760
City and town halls in Northumberland
Berwick-upon-Tweed